Chestnut Hill, North Carolina may refer to:
Chestnut Hill, Ashe County, North Carolina
Chestnut Hill, Henderson County, North Carolina
Chestnut Hill Township, Ashe County, North Carolina